A supercentenarian (sometimes hyphenated as super-centenarian) is someone who has lived to or passed their 110th birthday. This age is achieved by about one in 1,000 centenarians.  Anderson et al. concluded that supercentenarians live a life typically free of major age-related diseases until shortly before maximum human lifespan is reached (theoretically estimated to be 126 years).

European supercentenarians

European supercentenarians are residents or emigrants from Europe who have attained or surpassed 110 years of age. , the Gerontology Research Group (GRG) had validated the longevity claims of more than 600 European supercentenarians. 

The oldest European ever, and the world's oldest person ever, was Frenchwoman Jeanne Calment, who lived to the age of 122 years and 164 days. This has been disputed by some researchers. The oldest European man ever was Christian Mortensen from Denmark, who emigrated to the United States where he died at the age of 115 years and 252 days. The oldest non-emigrant European man was Spaniard Joan Riudavets Moll, who lived 114 years and 81 days.

Beyond the 50 oldest Europeans in aggregate, there are more detailed lists of the oldest Belgian, British, Danish, Dutch, Finnish, French, German, Irish, Italian, Norwegian, Portuguese, Spanish and Swedish people.

Oldest European residents ever
Below is a list of the oldest 50 supercentenarians who have died or are living in Europe. The list including all known and validated supercentenarians who died before 2015 was compiled by the Gerontology Research Group (GRG). Later cases were sourced either from more recent (GRG) data, from administrative reports or from press coverage, as indicated in the table.

Oldest European emigrants ever
Below is a list of the oldest five supercentenarians born in Europe who emigrated to another continent and either died or are still living there.

African supercentenarians 
This is an incomplete list of people born in Africa who have lived at least 110 years. Most of the listed persons were born in former colonies that already maintained systematic birth records in the 19th century. Many other supercentenarian cases likely exist in Africa, but are not adequately documented.

Asian supercentenarians 

This is an incomplete list of supercentenarians who were born or died in Asia, or are living there. According to the Gerontology Research Group, the verified oldest Asian person ever is Kane Tanaka of Japan, who died on 19 April 2022, aged 119 years and 107 days. The verified oldest man is Jiroemon Kimura, also from Japan, who died on 12 June 2013, aged 116 years and 54 days.

The vast majority of verified Asian cases of supercentenarians come from Japan, which has kept birth records for more than a century, while other Asian countries have historically been less meticulous about keeping such records. According to The Washington Post, China and India have many supercentenarians, but none are confirmed, as their governments did not track births prior to the early 1900s.

Japan

Notable supercentenarians from other Asian countries

Oldest known Asian emigrants

Supercentenarians in Oceania 
Below is a list of supercentenarians who have died or are living in Oceania. The list including all known and validated supercentenarians who died before 2015 was compiled by the Gerontology Research Group (GRG). Later cases were sourced either from more recent GRG data, from administrative reports or from press coverage, as indicated in the table. All Australian supercentenarians born prior to 1 January 1901 were born in the British colonies of Australia.

North American supercentenarians

United States

Canada

Other North American countries and territories

South American supercentenarians

References 

Supercentenarians
Lists of supercentenarians